"Mitten unterm Jahr" is the seventh single from Christina Stürmer's fourth album, Lebe lauter. Translated to English, the title means, "In the Middle of the Year".

Charts 
The single was only released in Austria, reaching number four on the charts.

2007 singles
Christina Stürmer songs
2007 songs
Polydor Records singles